Il mulino del Po (internationally released as The Mill on the Po) is a 1949 Italian drama film directed by Alberto Lattuada. It is based on the novel with the same name by Riccardo Bacchelli.

Cast 
Carla Del Poggio: Berta
Jacques Sernas: Orbino
Mario Besesti: il padrone
Giacomo Giuradei: Princivalle
Isabella Riva: donna Cecilia
Nino Pavese: Raibolini
Giulio Calì: Smarazzacucco
Anna Carena: L'Argìa
Leda Gloria: La Sniza
Dina Sassoli: Susanna

References

External links 

1949 films
Films directed by Alberto Lattuada
1949 drama films
Italian black-and-white films
Italian drama films
Films based on Italian novels
Films scored by Ildebrando Pizzetti
1940s Italian-language films
1940s Italian films